Face Value is a 1918 American silent drama film starring Mae Murray and directed by Robert Z. Leonard. It was released by Universal Film and produced by their second tier production unit Bluebird.

This film survives with a copy in the George Eastman House Motion Picture Collection.

Plot
As described in a film magazine, Joan (Murray), a waif that was adopted by the keeper of a boarding house, runs away and becomes a cashier at a Childs Restaurant, but quits when the manager attempts to make love to her. She meets Louie (Ferguson), with whom she was once friendly, and he forces her to steal for him. She is caught and sentenced to a state reformatory. En route she escapes from the train by jumping into a stream and swims ashore, where she is picked up by Bertram (Oakman), the son of wealthy parents. He takes her home and she is permitted to stay there. Louie tries several times to get Joan under his power, but fails. Bertram marries Joan despite her past.

Cast
Mae Murray - Joan Darby
Clarissa Selwynne - Mrs. Van Twiller
Florence Carpenter - Margaret Van Twiller
Wheeler Oakman - Bertram Van Twiller
Casson Ferguson - Louis Maguire
Mrs. Griffith - Mrs. Kelly

Reception
Like many American films of the time, Face Value was subject to cuts by city and state film censorship boards. For example, the Chicago Board of Censors required a cut of the young woman coming from behind the post and fainting in a man's arms and the man stealing a pocketbook.

References

External links

lantern slide

1918 films
American silent feature films
Films directed by Robert Z. Leonard
Universal Pictures films
1918 drama films
American black-and-white films
Silent American drama films
1910s American films